A check engine light or malfunction indicator lamp (MIL), is a tell-tale that a computerized engine-management system used to indicate a malfunction.

The light generally has two stages: steady (indicating a minor fault) and flashing (indicating a severe fault). When the MIL is lit, the engine control unit stores a fault code related to the malfunction, which can be retrieved—although in many models this requires the use of a scan tool. This warning light can indicate almost anything from a loose gas cap to a serious knock in the engine.

In the United States, specific functions are required of the MIL by EPA regulations.

History
Some older vehicles had a single indicator labeled "trouble" or "engine"; this was not an MIL, but an "idiot light" meant to indicate serious trouble with the engine (low oil pressure, overheating, or charging system problems) and an imminent breakdown. This usage of the "engine" light was discontinued in the mid-1980s, to prevent confusion with the MIL. 

The MIL appeared in the early 80s along with computerized engine controls. Even the earliest systems, such as General Motors' CCC (computer command control) system had self diagnosis functionality. When the computer detected a fault, it illuminated the MIL. Up until OBDII, on most cars the MIL could output codes. When two pins on the ALDL are jumped, the light would flash the codes, for instance (blink) (pause) (blink) (blink) for code 12. Some manufacturers, such as Honda, retained this feature even after OBDII.

The MIL is commonly referred to today as the "check engine light" or the "service engine soon light".

Odometer triggering
Some vehicles manufactured from the late 1990s to mid 2000s have a MIL that illuminates based on the odometer reading, regardless of engine operation. Volvo had a light labeled "lambda", lambda sond being another name for oxygen sensor. This was done in order to remind the driver to change the oxygen sensor. Some American-built 1973–1976 Chrysler Corporation vehicles had a similar odometer-triggered reminder: "Check EGR", which was reset after service at a Chrysler dealership.

Other triggering
The MIL is also illuminated prior to starting the engine, along with other tell-tales on the dashboard, to demonstrate that the lamp is working and not burned out. The lamp will turn off once the car is started if no monitored faults exist. The MIL will also illuminate if the engine has been cranked but failed to start after returning the ignition to "on". In most modern vehicles this is usually due to not giving the engine enough cranking time to start. In pre-fuel injection years many cranking attempts were sometimes required to start the car. If the engine fails to start on the second or third attempt then an actual visual check of the engine could be required. If the engine suddenly stalls or is triggered by an overload, such as on a manual transmission car, the MIL will also illuminate until the engine is started again.

False triggering
Higher amounts of methanol/ethanol (or other additives) than the engine is equipped to handle may trigger the MIL (see E85). These burn differently from gasoline, and the EFI system may mistakenly interpret the oxygen sensor's readings as being incorrect. Oxygenated gasoline can cause this false triggering in early EFI systems.

See also
 OBD-II PIDs ("Parameter IDs")

References

Vehicle parts